Willem Driebergen (4 June 1892 – 7 April 1965) was a Dutch fencer. He competed in the individual and team épée events at the 1928 and 1936 Summer Olympics.

References

1892 births
1965 deaths
Dutch male fencers
Olympic fencers of the Netherlands
Fencers at the 1928 Summer Olympics
Fencers at the 1936 Summer Olympics
Sportspeople from Katwijk
20th-century Dutch people